T.C.C.P is the debut release by the Minneapolis punk band The Soviettes.  It was released on Pop Riot Records, a Minneapolis label run by Max Peters.

It's the only release by the Soviettes featuring Lane Pederson, of the Dillinger Four, on drums instead of Danny Henry.  Razorcake magazine described the record as sweet, slashing and heavy and went onto say "The Soviettes stand out in a lineup against the waves of mediocre bands attempting the same".

Track listing

Side one

"Hot Sauced & Peppered" – 2:34
"In The Red" – 1:21

Side two

"Go Lambs Go!" – 1:58
"Sandbox" – 1:25

Personnel
Annie Holoien – guitar, vocals
Maren "Stugeon" Macosko – guitar, vocals
Susy Sharp – bass guitar, vocals
Lane Pederson – drums

References

External links

Lyrics.Wikia - the band's lyrics

2002 EPs
The Soviettes albums